In quantum field theory, a false vacuum is a hypothetical vacuum that is relatively stable, but not in the most stable state possible. This condition is known as metastable. It may last for a very long time in that state, but could eventually decay to the more stable state, an event known as false vacuum decay. The most common suggestion of how such a decay might happen in our universe is called bubble nucleation – if a small region of the universe by chance reached a more stable vacuum, this "bubble" (also called "bounce") would spread.

A false vacuum exists at a local minimum of energy and is therefore not completely stable, in contrast to a true vacuum, which exists at a global minimum and is stable.

Definition of true vs. false vacuum 
A vacuum is defined as a space with as little energy in it as possible. Despite the name, the vacuum still has quantum fields. A true vacuum is stable because it is at a global minimum of energy, and is commonly assumed to coincide with the physical vacuum state we live in. It is possible that a physical vacuum state is a configuration of quantum fields representing a local minimum but not global minimum of energy. This type of vacuum state is called a "false vacuum".

Implications

Existential threat 
If our universe is in a false vacuum state rather than a true vacuum state, then the decay from the less stable false vacuum to the more stable true vacuum (called false vacuum decay) could have dramatic consequences. The effects could range from complete cessation of existing fundamental forces, elementary particles and structures comprising them, to subtle change in some cosmological parameters, mostly depending on the potential difference between true and false vacuum. Some false vacuum decay scenarios are compatible with survival of structures like galaxies and stars or even biological life while others involve the full destruction of baryonic matter or even immediate gravitational collapse of the universe, although in this more extreme case the likelihood of a "bubble" forming may be very low (i.e., false vacuum decay may be impossible).

A paper by Coleman and de Luccia which attempted to include simple gravitational assumptions into these theories noted that if this was an accurate representation of nature, then the resulting universe "inside the bubble" in such a case would appear to be extremely unstable and would almost immediately collapse:

In a 2005 paper published in Nature, as part of their investigation into global catastrophic risks, MIT physicist Max Tegmark and Oxford philosopher Nick Bostrom calculate the natural risks of the destruction of the Earth at less than 1/109 per year from all natural (i.e. non-anthropogenic) events, including a transition to a lower vacuum state. They argue that due to observer selection effects, we might underestimate the chances of being destroyed by vacuum decay because any information about this event would reach us only at the instant when we too were destroyed. This is in contrast to events like risks from impacts, gamma-ray bursts, supernovae and hypernovae, the frequencies of which we have adequate direct measures.

Inflation 
A number of theories suggest that cosmic inflation may be an effect of a false vacuum decaying into the true vacuum. The inflation itself may be the consequence of the Higgs field trapped in a false vacuum state with Higgs self-coupling λ and its βλ function very close to zero at the planck scale. A future electron-positron collider would be able to provide the precise measurements of the top quark needed for such calculations.

Chaotic inflation theory suggests that the universe may be in either a false vacuum or a true vacuum state. Alan Guth, in his original proposal for cosmic inflation, proposed that inflation could end through quantum mechanical bubble nucleation of the sort described above. See history of Chaotic inflation theory. It was soon understood that a homogeneous and isotropic universe could not be preserved through the violent tunneling process. This led Andrei Linde and, independently, Andreas Albrecht and Paul Steinhardt, to propose "new inflation" or "slow roll inflation" in which no tunnelling occurs, and the inflationary scalar field instead graphs as a gentle slope.

In 2014, researchers at the Chinese Academy of Sciences' Wuhan Institute of Physics and Mathematics suggested that the universe could have been spontaneously created from nothing (no space, time, nor matter) by quantum fluctuations of metastable false vacuum causing an expanding bubble of true vacuum.

Vacuum decay varieties

Electroweak vacuum decay

The stability criteria for the electroweak interaction was first formulated in 1979 as a function of the masses of the theoretical Higgs boson and the heaviest fermion. Discovery of the top quark in 1995 and the Higgs boson in 2012 have allowed physicists to validate the criteria against experiment, therefore since 2012 the electroweak interaction is considered as the most promising candidate for a metastable fundamental force. The corresponding false vacuum hypothesis is called either 'Electroweak vacuum instability' or 'Higgs vacuum instability'. The present false vacuum state is called  (de Sitter space), while tentative true vacuum is called  (Anti-de Sitter space).

The diagrams show the uncertainty ranges of Higgs boson and top quark masses as oval-shaped lines. Underlying colors indicate if the electroweak vacuum state is likely to be stable, merely long-lived or completely unstable for given combination of masses. The "electroweak vacuum decay" hypothesis was sometimes misreported as the Higgs boson "ending" the universe.
However, a definitive answer requires much more precise measurements of the top quark's pole mass, although  improved measurement precision of Higgs boson and top quark masses further reinforced the claim of physical electroweak vacuum being in the metastable state as of 2018. Nonetheless, new physics beyond the Standard Model of Particle Physics could drastically change the stability landscape division lines, rendering previous stability and metastability criteria incorrect.

If measurements of the Higgs boson and top quark suggest that our universe lies within a false vacuum of this kind, this would imply, more than likely in many billions of years, that the bubble's effects will propagate across the universe at nearly the speed of light from its origin in space-time.

Other decay modes
 Decay to smaller vacuum expectation value, resulting in decrease of Casimir effect and destabilization of proton.
 Decay to vacuum with larger neutrino mass (may have happened as late as few billion years ago).
 Decay to vacuum with no dark energy.

Bubble nucleation

When the false vacuum decays, the lower-energy true vacuum forms through a process known as bubble nucleation. In this process, instanton effects cause a bubble containing the true vacuum to appear. The walls of the bubble (or domain walls) have a positive surface tension, as energy is expended as the fields roll over the potential barrier to the true vacuum. The former tends as the cube of the bubble's radius while the latter is proportional to the square of its radius, so there is a critical size  at which the total energy of the bubble is zero; smaller bubbles tend to shrink, while larger bubbles tend to grow. To be able to nucleate, the bubble must overcome an energy barrier of height

Rewriting  gives the critical radius as

A bubble smaller than the critical size can overcome the potential barrier via quantum tunnelling of instantons to lower energy states. For a large potential barrier, the tunneling rate per unit volume of space is given by

where  is the reduced Planck constant. Due to the typically large difference in energy between the false and true vacuums, the speed of the wall approaches the speed of light extremely quickly. The bubble does not produce any gravitational effects because the negative energy density of the bubble interior is cancelled out by the positive kinetic energy of the wall.

Small bubbles of true vacuum can be inflated to critical size by providing energy, although required energy densities are several orders of magnitude larger than what is attained in any natural or artificial process. It is also thought that certain environments can catalyze bubble formation by lowering the potential barrier.

Bubble wall has a finite thickness, depending on ratio between energy barrier and energy gain obtained by creating true vacuum. In the case when potential barrier height between true and false vacua is much smaller than energy difference between vacua, shell thickness become comparable with critical radius.

Nucleation seeds

Black holes as nucleation seeds
In a study in 2015, it was pointed out that the vacuum decay rate could be vastly increased in the vicinity of black holes, which would serve as a nucleation seed. According to this study, a potentially catastrophic vacuum decay could be triggered at any time by primordial black holes, should they exist. The authors note however that if primordial black holes cause a false vacuum collapse then it should have happened long before humans evolved on Earth. A subsequent study in 2017 indicated that the bubble would collapse into a primordial black hole rather than originate from it, either by ordinary collapse or by bending space in such a way that it breaks off into a new universe. In 2019, it was found that although small non-spinning black holes may increase true vacuum nucleation rate, rapidly spinning black holes will stabilize false vacuums to decay rates lower than expected for flat space-time. 

If particle collisions produce mini black holes then energetic collisions such as the ones produced in the Large Hadron Collider (LHC) could trigger such a vacuum decay event, a scenario which has attracted the attention of the news media. It is likely to be unrealistic, because if such mini black holes can be created in collisions, they would also be created in the much more energetic collisions of cosmic radiation particles with planetary surfaces or during the early life of the universe as tentative primordial black holes. Hut and Rees note that, because cosmic ray collisions have been observed at much higher energies than those produced in terrestrial particle accelerators, these experiments should not, at least for the foreseeable future, pose a threat to our current vacuum. Particle accelerators have reached energies of only approximately eight tera electron volts (8×1012 eV). Cosmic ray collisions have been observed at and beyond energies of 5×1019 eV, six million times more powerful – the so-called Greisen–Zatsepin–Kuzmin limit – and cosmic rays in vicinity of origin may be more powerful yet. John Leslie has argued that if present trends continue, particle accelerators will exceed the energy given off in naturally occurring cosmic ray collisions by the year 2150. Fears of this kind were raised by critics of both the Relativistic Heavy Ion Collider and the Large Hadron Collider at the time of their respective proposal, and determined to be unfounded by scientific inquiry.

In a 2021 paper by Rostislav Konoplich and others it was postulated that the area between a pair of large black holes on the verge of colliding could provide the conditions to create bubbles of "true vacuum". Intersecting surfaces between these bubbles could then become infinitely dense and form micro-black holes. These would in turn evaporate by emitting Hawking radiation in the 10 milliseconds or so before the larger black holes collided and devoured any bubbles or micro-black holes in their way. The theory could be tested by looking for the Hawking radiation emitted just before the black holes merge.

Bubble propagation
Bubble wall, propagating outward at nearly the speed of light, has a finite thickness, depending on ratio between energy barrier and energy gain obtained by creating true vacuum. In the case when potential barrier height between true and false vacua is much smaller than energy difference between vacua, bubble wall thickness become comparable with critical radius.

Elementary particles entering the wall will likely decay to other particles or black holes. If all decay paths leads to very massive particles, energy barrier of such decay may result in stable bubble of false vacuum (called Fermi ball) enclosing the false-vacuum particle instead of immediate decay. Multi-particle objects can be stabilized as Q-balls, although these objects will eventually collide and decay either to the black holes or true-vacuum particles.

False vacuum decay in fiction 
False vacuum decay event is occasionally used as a plot device in works picturing a doomsday event.

1988 by Geoffrey A. Landis in his science-fiction short story Vacuum States
2000 by Stephen Baxter in his science fiction novel Time
2002 by Greg Egan in his science fiction novel Schild's Ladder
2008 by Koji Suzuki in his science fiction novel Edge
2015 by Alastair Reynolds in his science fiction novel Poseidon's Wake

See also

References

Further reading

External links 
  calcualtes the Euclidean action for the bounce solution which contributes to the false vacuum decay.
 
 

 

  – Joel Thorarinson

Physical cosmology
Quantum field theory
Inflation (cosmology)
Space hazards
Ultimate fate of the universe
Vacuum